Coleman Bennett Yeatts Sr. (October 31, 1908 – November 22, 1993) was an American attorney and politician, who served as a member of the Virginia House of Delegates and Virginia Senate. Upon his election to the House in 1935, he was the youngest member of that body. More than 30 years after leaving the House, he sought election to the Senate, where he served until his defeat in 1979.

References

External links
 
 

1908 births
1993 deaths
University of Virginia School of Law alumni
Democratic Party Virginia state senators
20th-century American politicians